Crooked Lake Park is a census-designated place (CDP) in Polk County, Florida, United States. The population was 1,682 at the 2000 census. It is part of the Lakeland–Winter Haven Metropolitan Statistical Area.

Geography
Crooked Lake Park is located at  (27.831739, -81.589984).

According to the United States Census Bureau, the CDP has a total area of 1.5 km2 (0.6 mi2), all land.V

Crooked Lake Park is across US 27 from Warner University.

Demographics

As of the census of 2000, there were 1,682 people, 645 households, and 472 families residing in the CDP.  The population density was 1,159.7/km2 (2,990.4/mi2).  There were 758 housing units at an average density of 522.6/km2 (1,347.6/mi2).  The racial makeup of the CDP was 91.56% White, 4.28% African American, 0.65% Native American, 0.36% Asian, 2.08% from other races, and 1.07% from two or more races. Hispanic or Latino of any race were 5.83% of the population.

There were 645 households, out of which 27.0% had children under the age of 18 living with them, 60.6% were married couples living together, 8.4% had a female householder with no husband present, and 26.7% were non-families. 22.5% of all households were made up of individuals, and 14.1% had someone living alone who was 65 years of age or older.  The average household size was 2.47 and the average family size was 2.84.

In the CDP, the population was spread out, with 21.8% under the age of 18, 12.5% from 18 to 24, 22.4% from 25 to 44, 22.0% from 45 to 64, and 21.3% who were 65 years of age or older.  The median age was 40 years. For every 100 females, there were 84.0 males.  For every 100 females age 18 and over, there were 82.1 males.

The median income for a household in the CDP was $35,804, and the median income for a family was $42,404. Males had a median income of $26,125 versus $22,075 for females. The per capita income for the CDP was $18,731.  About 3.0% of families and 5.3% of the population were below the poverty line, including 4.6% of those under age 18 and none of those age 65 or over.

References

Census-designated places in Polk County, Florida
Census-designated places in Florida